Jalan Kinabalu Flyover or Kinabalu Flyover is a flyover in Kuala Lumpur, Malaysia and was the first flyover built in the country after independence on 1957. Construction began in 1963 and was completed in 1965. The flyover was opened to traffic in August 1965 and is part of the Kuala Lumpur Inner Ring Road system.

References

Bridges in Malaysia